Perenniporiopsis is a genus of fungi belonging to the Polyporaceae family.  It was documented in 2017 by Chang Lin Zhao. It contains the single species: Perenniporiopsis minutissima.

References 

Taxa described in 2017
Polyporaceae
Agaricomycetes genera